The Embassy of Afghanistan in Berlin is the diplomatic mission of the Islamic Republic of Afghanistan to Germany. Yama Yari has been the ambassador since February 3, 2021.

The embassy is located in a country house at Taunusstraße 3 in the Berlin district of Grunewald in the Charlottenburg-Wilmersdorf district. The embassy site is on the corner of Kronberger Strasse 5. The consulate belonging to the embassy is located at this address. Afghanistan also maintains two Consul generals in Bonn and in Grünwald near Munich, in Bonn they emerged from the former seat of the embassy.

See also

List of diplomatic missions of Germany
Afghanistan-Germany relations
Embassy of Germany, Kabul

References

Afghanistan–Germany relations
Buildings and structures in Berlin
Berlin
Afghanistan